Somewhere in the Middle is Jason Boland & The Stragglers's fourth album. It was released in September 2004. It is the first album by the band to be produced by Lloyd Maines. The song "Thunderbird Wine" is a cover of the Billy Joe Shaver song featured on the 1981 album I'm Just An Old Chunk Of Coal. The album itself is dedicated to Shaver, stating "may he live forever." The song "Hank" was originally recorded by Eleven Hundred Springs and released on their 2004 album, Bandwagon under the title, "Hank Williams Wouldn't Make It Now In Nashville, Tennessee". The last track features Randy Crouch singing lead vocals on the song, "Hope You Make It."

Track listing
"Hank" (Aaron Wynne) - 3:21
"When I'm Stoned" (Jason Boland) - 3:22
"Somewhere In The Middle" (Boland) - 4:39
"If You Want To Hear A Love Song" (Boland) - 3:59
"Back To You" (Bob Childers) - 3:06
"Stand Up To The Man" (Boland) - 3:58
"Radio's Misbehaving" (Boland) - 3:44
"Dirty Fightin' Love" (Boland, Stoney LaRue) - 3:42
"12 Oz. Curls" (Randy Crouch) - 3:54
"Mary" (Boland) - 6:09
"Thunderbird Wine" (Billy Joe Shaver) - 5:20
"Hell Or Bust" (Boland) - 5:50
"Hope You Make It" (Crouch) - 8:03

Personnel
Jason Boland - Lead Vocals, Acoustic Guitar
Roger Ray - Electric Guitar, Pedal Steel Guitar, Lap Steel, Resophonic Guitar
Brad Rice - Drums, Harmony Vocals
Grant Tracy - Bass
Noah Jeffries - Fiddle, Mandolin
Stoney LaRue - Acoustic Guitar, Harmony Vocals
Randy Crouch - Lead Vocals (Track 13), Fiddle, Harmony Vocals
Riley Osbourn - Hammond B3, Wurlitzer
Lloyd Maines - Acoustic Guitar
Dennis Ludiker - Fiddle
Doug Moreland - Fiddle
Will Dupuy - Acoustic Guitar
Coby Weir - Electric Guitar
John Michael Whitby - Piano
Adam Odor - Accordion
Billy Joe Shaver - Harmony Vocals
Kathleen O'Keefe - Harmony Vocals
Cody Braun - Harmony Vocals

Chart performance

References 

Jason Boland & The Stragglers albums
2004 albums